Trausch is a German surname, which is a variant of Trauschke, and derived from the Old Slavic drugu, meaning "companion". Notable people with the surname include:

Gilbert Trausch (1931–2018), Luxembourgian historian
Eugen von Trauschenfels (1833–1903), Austro-Hungarian writer

See also
Stade François Trausch, a football stadium in Mamer, Luxembourg

References

German-language surnames
Surnames of Luxembourgian origin